The Staphylococcus-1 RNA motif is a conserved RNA structure that was discovered by bioinformatics.
A Staphylococcus-1 motif RNAs is found in Staphylococcus species CAG-324, which has not yet (as of 2018) been more precisely classified.  Other examples of Staphylococcus-1 RNAs are present in metagenomic sequences that do not correspond to a classified organism.  It is assumed that the organism corresponding to these sequences are related to the Staphylococcus species.

Most Staphylococcus-1 RNAs are found in the apparent 5′ untranslated regions (5′ UTRs) of genes whose protein products exhibit a borderline similarity to HNH endonucleases.  This genetic arrangement could suggest that Staphylococcus-1 RNAs function as cis-regulatory elements. However, one Staphylococcus-1 RNA is not located in a 5′ UTR calls this hypothesis into question, and suggests that the RNAs more likely function as small RNAs.

References

Non-coding RNA